The National Council for Economics and Labour (in italian, Consiglio nazionale dell'economia e del lavoro or CNEL) is a constitutional organ provided for by Article 99 of Constitution of Italy and established in 1957. 
The CNEL is an assembly of experts that advises the Italian government, Parliament and the regions, and promotes legislative initiatives on economic and social matters. The 2016 Italian constitutional referendum tried to abolish it, but the reform was rejected.

Composition
Article 99 of the Constitution of Italy lays down that "the National Council for Economics and Labour is composed, as set out by law, of experts and representatives of economic categories in such proportions as to take account of their numerical and qualitative importance". Elections of members of the CNEL are held under Law n. 936 of 30 December 1986.

In accordance with Law no. 214 of 2011 the CNEL is composed of 65 members:
 the President of the CNEL, nominated by the President of the Italian Republic;
 ten experts on economic, social and legal affairs;
 eight members nominated by the President of the Republic on his/her own initiative;
 two members chosen by the President of Italy after nomination by the Prime Minister following a decision of the Council of Ministers;
 48 representatives of public- and private-sector producers of goods and services, specifically,
 19 representatives of trade unions;
 three representatives of public and private management;
 nine representatives of self-employed workers;
 17 representatives of industry;
 six representatives of NGOs.

Members of the CNEL are elected for five years.

Presidents

Headquarters

The CNEL is based in the Villa Lubin, built by David Lubin in the park of Villa Borghese in Rome. It was previously the headquarters of the International Institute of Agriculture, from 1908 to 1945.

See also
Constitution of Italy
European Economic and Social Committee
International Association of Economic and Social Councils and Similar Institutions

Bibliography

References

External links

Organizations established in 1957
Institutions of constitutional importance of Italy